Cassinia arcuata, commonly known as drooping cassinia, biddy bush, Chinese scrub, sifton bush and Chinese shrub, is a species of flowering plant in the family Asteraceae and is endemic to Australia. It is a shrub, sometimes a small tree with sessile, linear leaves, and heads of up to two hundred brownish flowers arranged in pyramid-shaped panicles. In New South Wales, the species is known as Cassinia sifton. In disturbed areas, C. arcuata can become weedy.

Description

Taxonomy and naming
Cassinia arcuata was first formally described in 1818 by Robert Brown in Transactions of the Linnean Society of London.

Cassinia sifton Orchard has been confused with C. arcuata and the National Herbarium of New South Wales lists only C. sifton as occurring in New South Wales. Plants of the World Online list both species as occurring in New South Wales.

Richard Hind Cambage used the name "Sifting Bush" for this species in 1902, comparing the fallen florets to "the 'siftings' which are blown away from grain by a winnowing machine". That name has since been corrupted to 'Sifton bush' in the mistaken belief that it referred to a person named Sifton.

The National Herbarium of Victoria considers C. sifton to be "widespread and common" in Victoria and that records prior to 2017 refer to that species.

Distribution and habitat
According to the Australian Plant Census, C. arcuata occurs in Western Australia, South Australia, New South Wales, the Australian Capital Territory and Victoria. It grows in mallee and woodland, and invades disturbed areas.

Use in horticulture
Drooping cassinia is an easily cultivated plant. It requires well-drained soils, grows in full or partial shade, but does not tolerate salt winds and is not long-lived.

References

arcuata
Asterales of Australia
Flora of New South Wales
Flora of South Australia
Flora of Victoria (Australia)
Eudicots of Western Australia
Taxa named by Robert Brown (botanist, born 1773)